The 2012-13 IIHF European Women's Champions Cup was the ninth playing of the IIHF European Women's Champions Cup. HC Tornado of Russia's Women's Hockey League won the tournament for the third time in four seasons and second consecutive time.

First round
The first round was contested from 5 to 22 October 2012

Group A
Group A was played in Bolzano, Italy.

Standings

  Bolzano Eagles advanced to the second round.

Results

Group B
Group B was played in Molodechno, Belarus.

Standings

  Aisulu Almaty advanced to the second round.

Schedule

Group C
Group C was played in Örnsköldsvik, Sweden.

Standings

  MODO Hockey advanced to the second round.

Schedule

Group D
Group D was played in Vienna, Austria.

Standings

  HC Slavia Praha advanced to the second round.

Schedule

Second round
The first round was contested from 2 to 4 December 2011

Group E
Group E was played in Dornbirn, Austria.

Standings

  MODO Hockey advanced to the final round.
  ZSC Lions Frauen advanced to the final round.

Schedule

Group F
Group F was played in Oulu, Finland.

Standings

  HC Tornado advanced to the final round.
  Oulun Kärpät advanced to the final round.

Schedule

Final round
The final round was hosted in Oulu, Finland, and played during 22–24 February 2013. The top two teams of each second-round group advanced to the final tournament.

Best Players selected by the directorate

External links
 International Ice Hockey Federation

IIHF European Women's Champions Cup
Women
Euro